The 1958–59 season was Stoke City's 52nd season in the Football League and the 19th in the Second Division.

Manager Frank Taylor again decided not to make any signings in the summer of 1958 and was to regret that decision as Stoke crashed to a 6–1 defeat on the opening day of the season. However Stoke's fortunes started to improve and two decent unbeaten runs before the new year lifted Stoke into the promotion race. But just six wins in 1959 saw Stoke finish in 5th position, eleven points behind second placed Fulham.

Season review

League
The rebuilding of the main stand at the Victoria Ground had been completed over the summer months and cost the club around £70,000 and whilst it was fine a stand the supporters had hoped it would have cost less to avoid swallowing up the seasons transfer budget. As a result, there were no major signings whatsoever for the 1958–59 season, and for the opening day match away at Fulham Stoke were without both Bobby Howitt and Tony Allen. They were badly missed as Stoke were hammered 6–1 by an impressive Fulham side led by Johnny Haynes. After a poor start to their league campaign Stoke went on a nine match unbeaten run and didn't lose a match in December to lift Stoke to third in the table. However following the turn of the year Stoke's form dropped and Sheffield Wednesday and Fulham pulled to far ahead as Stoke ended the season in 5th place.

It had been a fairly uninspiring yet somewhat of a transitional season with Neville Coleman moving on to Crewe Alexandra for a modest fee after scoring 52 goals in 126 games for the club while three club legends Frank Bowyer, John McCue and Harry Oscroft where entering the veteran stage of their careers. Before the season was out Oscroft was involved in a three-man swap, as he and Peter Ford move to Vale Park in exchange for John Cunliffe a left-winger who had a good career at Vale but failed to make an impression with Stoke. John Sellars who missed the season due to an eye injury decided to retire and Stoke decided to end their season with a trip to Morocco.

FA Cup
In the third round Dennis Wilshaw bagged a hat trick as Oldham Athletic were well beaten 5–1 before Ipswich Town came and frustrated Stoke and in the fourth round before nicking a 1–0 win.

Final league table

Results

Stoke's score comes first

Legend

Football League Second Division

FA Cup

Friendlies

Squad statistics

References

Stoke City F.C. seasons
Stoke